CIAT-FM is a country music radio station that is licensed to and based in Assiniboia, Saskatchewan, Canada. The station broadcasts at 98.1 megahertz. The station's studios are located on Third Avenue in Assiniboia, with their transmitting facility located near Willow Bunch, Saskatchewan.

History 
In the latter half of July 2018, an article printed in the Regina Leader-Post has reported that a former radio morning show co-host named Steven Huber was planning to build a new radio station to serve rural areas of southern Saskatchewan. The application to the CRTC was approved on July 26, 2018. The station's plans include an in-house news department, along with road, cultural, and community information, along with programming devoted to the agricultural interest as the area the station would serve is predominantly rural. More than four hours of spoken-word programming is broadcast daily. The station originally planned to broadcast under callsign CHOG-FM. However, in 2019, the station chose to take the callsign CIAT-FM so it can be referenced to its eventual branding, Cat Country.
The station's transmitting facilities and tower were completed in January 2019. A test loop began airing on the station in January, with its official launch taking place on March 15, 2019.

Around April 19, 2021, CIAT began broadcasting in HD Radio, becoming the first HD radio station in Saskatchewan. The HD broadcast features artist experience including the song/artist title and album art.

Coverage area 
The station's coverage area includes most of the area within an  radius, serving a good portion of south-central Saskatchewan, mainly in an area from Val Marie to near Weyburn, and from an area across the Canada–United States border into northeastern Montana, also covering portions of Daniels, Sheridan and northern Valley Counties, northward to provide at least a rimshot signal into an area along Saskatchewan Highway 1 (Trans Canada Highway) in the Moose Jaw/Regina area.

References

External links

CIAT Facebook Page

IAT-FM
Radio stations established in 2019
Country radio stations in Canada